Bhagyamudra is a 1967 Indian Malayalam-language film written by S. L. Puram Sadanandan and directed by M. A. V. Rajendran. It stars Prem Nazeer, Meenakumari, Adoor Bhasi, Muthukulam Raghavan Pillai, Manavalan Joseph, Kottayam Shantha, Kalavathi, G. K. Pillai, K. R. Vijaya, Sukumari, C. R. Lakshmy, Devaki and Baby Shakeela. The movie is a remake of the 1954 Bengali movie  Chheley Kaar.

Cast

Prem Nazir
Sukumari
Adoor Bhasi
Kottayam Santha
Manavalan Joseph
Muthukulam Raghavan Pillai
Baby Shakeela
C. R. Lakshmi
Devaki	
G. K. Pillai
K. R. Vijaya
Kalavathi
Meena

Soundtrack
The music was composed by Pukazhenthi and the lyrics were written by P. Bhaskaran.

References

External links
 

1968 films
1960s Malayalam-language films
Malayalam remakes of Bengali films
Films scored by Pukazhenthi